Leon Flack (born 25 January 1981) is a British short track speed skater. He competed in three events at the 2002 Winter Olympics.

References

External links
 

1981 births
Living people
British male short track speed skaters
Olympic short track speed skaters of Great Britain
Short track speed skaters at the 2002 Winter Olympics
People from Islington (district)